Denmark competed at the 2020 Summer Paralympics in Tokyo from 25 August to 6 September.

Medalists

Athletics

Two athletes have qualified to compete.
Men's track

Men's field

Women's field

Badminton

Cycling 

Denmark have secured quotas in cycling.

Road

Equestrian 

Denmark sent four athletes after they qualified.

Swimming

Denmark have qualified one swimmer to compete at the 2020 Summer Paralympics.
Women

Table tennis

Denmark entered one athletes into the table tennis competition at the games. Peter Rosenmeier qualified from 2019 ITTF European Para Championships which was held in Helsingborg, Sweden.

Men

Taekwondo

Denmark qualified one athletes to compete at the Paralympics competition. Lisa Gjessing will compete after placing first in world ranking, to booked one of six available quotas.

Wheelchair rugby

Denmark national wheelchair rugby team qualified for the Games for the first time by finishing top two at the 2019 European Championship Division A in Vejle. 

Team roster
 Team event – 1 team of 12 players

Group stage

Seventh place match

See also
Denmark at the Paralympics
Denmark at the 2020 Summer Olympics

References

Nations at the 2020 Summer Paralympics
2020
2021 in Danish sport